

Events

Popular music
perhaps around this time "The Ballad of Chevy Chase" (second version)

Publications
 Agostino Agazzari – , Op. 19 (Venice: Bartolomeo Magni for Gardano), a collection of madrigals
 Giovanni Francesco Anerio –  (Rome: Giovanni Battista Robletti)
 Adriano Banchieri – First book of masses and motets arranged for one bass and two tenor voices with organ, Op. 42 (Venice: Alessandro Vincenti)
 Aurelio Bonelli – Masses and motets for four voices (Venice: Alessandro Vincenti)
 Antonio Cifra
 for eight voices (Assisi: Giacomo Salvi)
Motets for four voices (Rome: Giovanni Battista Robletti)
 Manuel Rodrigues Coelho – Flores de musica pera o instrumento de tecla & harpa (Lisbon: Pedro Craesbeck), the earliest keyboard music printed in Portugal
 Christoph Demantius
 for four, five, and six voices (Freiberg: Georg Hoffmann), a collection of funeral music
 for eight voices (Freiberg: Georg Hoffmann), an epithalamium for the wedding of Augustus von Schönberg and Ursula Haubold on March 6
 for eight voices (Freiberg Georg Hoffmann), an epithalamium for the wedding of Johann Hassen and Susanna Horn on May 30
Richard Dering
Canzonettas for four voice with basso continuo (Antwerp: Pierre Phalèse)
Canzonettas for three voices with basso continuo (Antwerp: Pierre Phalèse)
 Melchior Franck
 for five voices (Coburg: Kaspar Bertsch), a wedding motet
 for six voices (Coburg: Andreas Forckel), a wedding motet
 Michelagnolo Galilei –  (Munich)
 Scipione Lacorcia – Third book of madrigals for five voices (Naples: Costantino Vitale)
 Ivan Lukačić –  for one, two, three, four, and five voices (Venice: Gardano), a collection of motets
 Carlo Milanuzzi –  for two, three, and four voices with basso continuo, Op. 3 (Venice: Alessandro Vincenti)
 Giovanni Bernardino Nanino
 for three voices and organ bass (Assisi: Giacomo Salvi)
 for four voices (Rome: Giovanni Battista Robletti)
 Giovanni Palazzotto e Tagliavia — Second book of madrigals to five voices (Palermo: Giovanni Battista Maringo)
 Martin Peerson – Private musicke, or the first booke of ayres and dialogues, contayning songs of 4. 5. and 6. parts (London: Thomas Snodham)

Births
September 6 – Isabella Leonarda, composer (d. 1704)
probable – Adam Drese, bass viol player and composer (d. 1701)

Deaths
March 1 – Thomas Campion, composer and poet (born 1567)
March 25 – Johannes Nucius, composer and music theorist (born c. 1556)
August 2 – Carolus Luython, composer (born 1557)
date unknown
Thomas Adams, music publisher (born c. 1566)
Joachim van den Hove, composer (born c.1567)
probable – Girolamo Belli, composer and music teacher (born 1552)

References

 
Music
17th century in music
Music by year